Connor Michael Brogdon (born January 29, 1995) is an American professional baseball pitcher for the Philadelphia Phillies of Major League Baseball (MLB).

Brogdon was born in Clovis, California, and attended Liberty High School in Madera. Although he was drafted by the Atlanta Braves in the 40th round of the 2013 MLB Draft, he decided to attend Fresno City College rather than sign with the team. After two seasons there, he transferred to Lewis–Clark State College, where he was part of the 2017 NAIA World Series championship team.

The Phillies drafted Brogdon in the 10th round of the 2017 MLB Draft. He was originally intended to be a starting pitcher but became a reliever in the minor leagues to make room in the starting rotation. Brogdon played for three seasons in the Phillies' farm system and was invited to an alternative training site after the 2020 minor league season was canceled. He made his MLB debut on August 13, 2020, giving up three runs to the Baltimore Orioles, but he improved his performance in September.

Early life
Brogdon was born in Clovis, California on January 29, 1995, and attended Liberty High School in Madera alongside San Francisco Giants prospect J.J. Santa Cruz. The Atlanta Braves of Major League Baseball (MLB) drafted Brogdon in the 40th round of the 2013 MLB Draft, but he elected to attend college instead. Although Brogdon signed a National Letter of Intent to play for Fresno State, he instead attended Fresno City College. In his two seasons with Fresno City College, Brogdon had a 9–0 win–loss record and a 1.85 earned run average (ERA), and he was named the Central Valley Conference Pitcher of the Year.

After his sophomore year, Brogdon transferred to Lewis–Clark State College, where he was used as a starting pitcher. In his first season at Lewis–Clark, Brogdon posted a 6–0 record, a 2.81 ERA, and 48 strikeouts in 11 games started and  innings pitched. His pitching velocity began to suffer in his senior season, dropping from the mid- range to the mid- range. Philadelphia Phillies scout Hilton Richardson told The Athletic, "I don't want to say they abused him, but he got worked a lot."

Professional career

Minor league system
The Phillies selected Brogdon in the 10th round, 293rd overall, in the 2017 MLB Draft. He was the highest Lewis–Clark draft pick since Beau Mills, who was taken in the first round. He signed with the team that year for a $5,000 signing bonus. Brogdon made his professional debut on June 26, 2017, with the Class A Short Season Williamsport Crosscutters, pitching  innings in a 9–5 loss against the Auburn Doubledays. Initially signed as a starting pitcher, Brogdon was moved to the Crosscutters' bullpen to make room in the starting rotation for Spencer Howard and Connor Seabold. In 16 appearances and  innings with the Crosscutters that season, Brogdon posted a 3–1 record and a 2.34 ERA.

The next season, Brogdon was named to the preliminary Opening Day roster for the Class A Lakewood BlueClaws alongside Crosscutters teammate Howard. Overall, he went 5–3 with a 2.47 ERA, but his ERA was only 1.42 in his 38 innings as a reliever. Brogdon continued to ascend through the farm system the next season, beginning 2019 with the Class A-Advanced Clearwater Threshers. He made only 10 appearances with the Threshers before receiving a promotion to the Double-A Reading Phillies. After only 15 games, he was promoted again to the Triple-A Lehigh Valley IronPigs. Across all three minor-league teams that year, Brogdon had a combined 6–2 record and a 2.61 ERA in 51 appearances.

Philadelphia Phillies
In response to the COVID-19 pandemic, MLB canceled the 2020 Minor League Baseball season. The Phillies chose to invite a handful of relievers, including Brogdon, to an alternative training site in Allentown, Pennsylvania, in case they were needed in the majors. Brogdon was officially called up to the Phillies' roster on August 11, 2020. He made his MLB debut on August 13, appearing in the eighth inning to relieve Austin Davis against the Baltimore Orioles. On Brogdon's first pitch, Pedro Severino hit a solo home run. After recording two outs, Brogdon surrendered another home run, this one a two-run blast, to Rio Ruiz. He was then pulled, having thrown 38 pitches in his debut. His performance improved in September, as he recorded 14 strikeouts in  shutout innings that month. Brogdon recorded his first career win on September 18, 2020, in the second game of a doubleheader against the Toronto Blue Jays. He finished the season with a 1–0 record and a 3.97 ERA in  innings pitched.

The Phillies called on Brogdon to pitch in the tenth inning of the season opener against the Atlanta Braves on April 1, 2021. He threw a shutout inning and was credited with the win. Brogdon did not allow a run in the 2021 MLB season until April 20, when he gave up two three-run home runs to Alex Dickerson and Wilmer Flores of the San Francisco Giants, causing the Phillies to lose 10–6.

He told The Philadelphia Inquirer that the 2021–22 MLB lockout had negatively impacted his practice regimen, because he did not know when the 2022 MLB season would begin, and that he was "just treading water" in spring training.

In the 2022 regular season with the Phillies, he was 2–2 with two saves and a 3.27 ERA in 47 relief appearances covering 44 innings with 50 strikeouts.

Pitcher profile
Brogdon relies primarily on a three-pitch repertoire: a fastball, a changeup, and a hybrid of a cutter and a slider. Speaking after the 2020 season, Brogdon has said that his focus, as he continues his baseball career, is to be able to sustain  fastball speeds over longer stretches at the mound. The "cut-slider" is his newest pitch, developed during his 2019 stint in the minors.

References

External links

1995 births
Living people
Baseball players from California
Clearwater Threshers players
Lakewood BlueClaws players
Lehigh Valley IronPigs players
Lewis–Clark State Warriors baseball players
Major League Baseball pitchers
Philadelphia Phillies players
Reading Fightin Phils players
Sportspeople from Clovis, California
Williamsport Crosscutters players
People from Madera, California